Alfred Hardy (1900–1965) was a Belgian contractor and autodidact architect. He became internationally known for his thin-shell concrete constructions in the 1950s and 1960s.

Born in Quiévrain, he came into contact during World War II with the Ghent Professor Gustave Magnel and Brussels contractor Emile Blaton. Together with Polish engineer Simon Chaikes, he designed in 1947 two cylindrical aircraft hangars for the Grimbergen Airfield. This design was included in the Twentieth Century Engineering retrospective of 1964 in the New York Museum of Modern Art. His pioneering constructions contributed in architecture to the development of thin shells made out of reinforced concrete, later used by architects like Eero Saarinen or Félix Candela. The hangars are protected since 2007.

He designed his own house in 1954 in Buizingen, Belgium. He also designed an agricultural shed in Villepreux in 1953 that was designated by the government of France as a Monument historique in 2010.

Hardy married Emma Dassy and had two daughters (Nelly and Adrienne). He died in 1965 in road accident.

References

External links 
 
 (en) Alfred Hardy, www.danda.be
 

Belgian architects
1900 births
1965 deaths
People from Quiévrain